Sredni Vashtar is a 1981 short film directed, written, and produced by Andrew Birkin. It is based on the short story of the same name written by Saki. 
It won the BAFTA award for Best Short Film, and was nominated for an Academy Award for Best Live Action Short Film.

Cast
Sacha Puttnam - Conradin (as Alexander Puttnam)
Judy Campbell - Aunt Augusta
Lila Kaye - Mrs. Woolridge
Patty Hannock - Effie
Gorden Kaye - Ogden
Vernon Dobtcheff - Dr. Russell
Allan Corduner - Mortimer
Shona Morris - Vera

References

External links

1981 films
British short films
Films directed by Andrew Birkin